The Japanese submarine chaser CH-24 was a  of the Imperial Japanese Navy during World War II. She was built by the Ōsaka Iron Works, Sakurajima and completed on 20 December 1941. On 24 August 1942, she left Rabaul as part of Operation RE, for the landings at Milne Bay. On March 15, 1943 she, along with CH-22 and Satsuki, sank a submarine, possibly , north west of the Admiralty Islands.

Fate

References
Ships of the World special issue Vol.45, Escort Vessels of the Imperial Japanese Navy, (Japan), February 1996
Model Art Extra No.340, Drawings of Imperial Japanese Naval Vessels Part-1,  (Japan), October 1989
The Maru Special, Japanese Naval Vessels No.49, Japanese submarine chasers and patrol boats,  (Japan), March 1981

External links

1941 ships
No.13-class submarine chasers
Maritime incidents in February 1944
World War II shipwrecks in the Pacific Ocean
Ships built by Osaka Iron Works